Shinkichi (written: 信吉, 慎吉, 新吉 or 進吉) is a masculine Japanese given name. Notable people with the name include:

, Japanese linguist
, Japanese ice hockey player
, Japanese footballer
, Japanese composer
, Dutch-American sculptor
, Japanese poet
, Japanese rugby Player

Japanese masculine given names